The Journal of Continuing Education in Nursing is a peer-reviewed nursing journal published by Slack. It was established in 1970 and publishes original articles for continuing education in nursing.

Abstracting and indexing
The journal is abstracted and indexed in:

According to the Journal Citation Reports, the journal has a 2017 impact factor of 0.820.

See also

List of nursing journals

References

External links

Publications established in 1970
Education journals
Monthly journals
English-language journals
General nursing journals